Alejandro 'Álex' Cruz Rodríguez (born 17 June 1990) is a Spanish footballer who plays for UD San Fernando as a midfielder.

Club career
Born in Mogán, Las Palmas, Canary Islands, Cruz made his senior debut in 2008 with local club UD Vecindario in Segunda División B. After good performances, he signed a four-year contract with Gimnàstic de Tarragona from Segunda División.

In his first season with the Catalans, Cruz was fairly used as they finished in 18th position with 51 points, but just one place before the relegation zone. His first match in the competition took place on 30 August 2009 when he came on as a late substitute in a 1–0 away win against Real Murcia, and his maiden goal occurred the following 17 January in a 2–2 draw at Elche CF.

Cruz agreed to a three-and-a-half year deal with Granada CF in January 2011. He achieved promotion to the second tier, but totalled only 121 minutes of action in the process.

In July 2011, Cruz was loaned to CE Sabadell FC, recently promoted to division two. The following summer, after scarcely featuring throughout the campaign, he joined UCAM Murcia CF, also on loan.

On 2 September 2013, Cruz signed for UE Llagostera after being released by Granada. He was released in June of the following year, and moved to Burgos CF also in the third tier on 8 August.

Cruz continued competing in the third division in the following years, representing Real Jaén, CD Mensajero, CD Ebro and CD Lealtad.

References

External links

1990 births
Living people
People from Mogán
Sportspeople from the Province of Las Palmas
Spanish footballers
Footballers from the Canary Islands
Association football midfielders
Segunda División players
Segunda División B players
Segunda Federación players
UD Vecindario players
Gimnàstic de Tarragona footballers
Granada CF footballers
CE Sabadell FC footballers
UCAM Murcia CF players
UE Costa Brava players
Burgos CF footballers
Real Jaén footballers
CD Mensajero players
CD Ebro players
CD Lealtad players
Football League (Greece) players
Doxa Drama F.C. players
Niki Volos F.C. players 
Spanish expatriate footballers
Expatriate footballers in Greece
Spanish expatriate sportspeople in Greece